Jaua may refer to:

 Cerro Jaua, Venezuela
 Elías Jaua (born 1969), Venezuelan politician